"Bedsitter" is a song by British synthpop duo Soft Cell, from the album Non-Stop Erotic Cabaret. Released as a single in early 2 November 1981, it reached No. 4 in the UK.

A song that explored the underbelly of the London club scene of the time, it has been described by critic Jon Savage as one of the greatest songs of the 1980s. Pet Shop Boys singer Neil Tennant recalled, "When [bandmate] Chris Lowe and I first met in 1981 there were two electro-pop singles we both loved: 'Bedsitter' by Soft Cell and 'Souvenir' by OMD."

References

External links

1981 songs
1981 singles
Soft Cell songs
Songs written by Marc Almond
Songs written by David Ball (electronic musician)
Some Bizzare Records singles